Richard Foronjy (born August 3, 1937) is an American film and television actor. He is perhaps best known for playing the mobster Tony Darvo in the 1988 film Midnight Run.

Partial filmography 

Serpico (1973) - Corsaro
The Gambler (1974) - Donny
Fun with Dick and Jane (1977) - Landscape Man
The One Man Jury (1978) - Al
The Fish That Saved Pittsburgh (1979) - Mike
The Jerk (1979) - Con Man
Prince of the City (1981) - Detective Joe Marinaro
True Confessions (1981) - Ambulance Driver
Gangster Wars (1981) - Umberto Joe The Boss' Bodyguard (uncredited)
Repo Man (1984) - Plettschner
Once Upon a Time in America (1984) - Officer Whitey aka Fartface
City Heat (1984) - Poker Player
Odd Jobs (1986) - Mannu
The Check Is in the Mail... (1986) - Tony
The Morning After (1986) - Sergeant Greenbaum
The Galucci Brothers (1987) - Galucci Brother
Midnight Run (1988) - Tony Darvo
Ghostbusters II (1989) - Con Ed Supervisor
Oscar (1991) - Knucky
Fatal Instinct (1992) - Cy Tarr
The Public Eye (1992) - Frank Farinelli
DaVinci's War (1993) - Hamlet
Carlito's Way (1993) - Pete Amadesso
Man of the House (1995) - Murray
Recoil (1998) - Vincent Sloan
Hoods (1998) - Tony
Evasive Action (1998) - Vince

References

External links 

Rotten Tomatoes profile

1937 births
Living people
People from Brooklyn
Male actors from New York (state)
American male film actors
American male television actors
20th-century American male actors
21st-century American male actors